The women's 10,000 metres at the 2006 European Athletics Championships were held at the Ullevi on August 7.

All three medallists set personal bests, with Norway's Wigene bettering her time by more than two minutes. Lornah Kiplagat of the Netherlands finished fifth after leading for most of the race, while Elvan Abeylegesse of Turkey, world season best holder, did not finish.

Medalists

Schedule

Results

Final

External links
Results

10000
10,000 metres at the European Athletics Championships
Marathons in Sweden
2006 in women's athletics